The Hopman Cup XXIX (also known as the 2017 Mastercard Hopman Cup for sponsorship reasons) was the 29th edition of the Hopman Cup tournament between nations in men's and women's tennis. It took place at the Perth Arena in Perth, Western Australia.

The defending champions were Australia. Roger Federer, 2001 champion, made his first appearance since 2002, alongside his partner Belinda Bencic.

For this edition, the Fast4 rule was implemented in Mixed Doubles matches. This marked the first time that an official tournament applied this rule since its inception in 2015.

In the final France defeated the US to win its second title.

Entrants

Seeds
The draw took place on 6 October 2016 and it placed the 8 teams into two groups, according to the following ranking-based seedings:

Replacement players

Group stage

Group A
All times are local (UTC+8).

Standings

France vs. Germany

Switzerland vs. Great Britain

France vs. Great Britain

Switzerland vs. Germany

Germany vs. Great Britain

Switzerland vs. France

Group B
All times are local (UTC+8).

Standings

Czech Republic vs. United States

Australia vs. Spain

United States vs. Spain

Australia vs. Czech Republic

Czech Republic vs. Spain

Australia vs. United States

Final

France vs. United States

See also
 2017 Australian Open Series

References

External links

 

2017 in tennis
2017
2017 in Australian tennis
January 2017 sports events in Australia